Chepkum is a settlement in Kenya's Elgeyo-Marakwet County. It was a part of the former Rift Valley Province.

References 

Populated places in Rift Valley Province